The Geometroidea are the superfamily of geometrid moths in the order Lepidoptera. It includes the families Geometridae, Uraniidae, Epicopeiidae, Sematuridae, and Pseudobistonidae. The Geomeatroidia superfamily has more than 24,000 described species, making them one of the largest superfamilies inside the order Lepidoptera. The monotypic genus Apoprogones was considered a separate geometroid family of the Apoprogonidae by a minority, but is now subsumed under the Sematuridae.

References

Further reading
Firefly Encyclopedia of Insects and Spiders, edited by Christopher O'Toole, 2002

 
Lepidoptera superfamilies
Macroheterocera